Blessing Oghnewresem Okagbare-Otegheri (born 9 October 1988) is a former Nigerian track and field athlete who specialized in Long jump and sprints. She is an Olympic and World Championships medalist in the long jump and a world medalist in the 200 meters. She also holds the Women's 100 meters Commonwealth Games record for the fastest time at 10.85 seconds. She is currently serving an 11-year ban for breaching multiple World Athletics anti-doping rules. Her ban expires on 30 July 2032.

Her 100 m best of 10.79 made her the African record holder for the event until it was eclipsed by Murielle Ahouré in 2016. On June 17, 2021, Okagbare ran a wind-aided 10.63 100 m. She was the African record holder over the 200m with a time of 22.04 seconds in 2018, thus making her the second-fastest African female athlete over the 200m behind Christine Mboma, who ran an African record of 21.78 seconds in 2021. She was the African 100 m and long jump champion in 2010. She has also won medals at the All-Africa Games, IAAF Continental Cup and World Relays.

Okagbare was suspended after failing a drugs test on 31 July 2021 during the 2020 Tokyo Olympics. On 18 February 2022 it was announced that she had been banned from athletics for a period of 10 years commencing 30 July 2021 for multiple breaches of World Athletics Anti-Doping rules. Following a hearing at the Athletics Integrity Unit that found her to have taken both human growth hormone and EPO over an extended period,  and to have failed to cooperate with the investigation, Okagbare was banned for ten years, effectively ending her athletics career in disgrace. On 23 June 2022, the AIU announced that Okagbare's ban had been extended by a year for further anti-doping offences.

Career

Early life
Of Urhobo heritage, Okagbare was born in Sapele, Delta, in Nigeria. Given her athletic physique, teachers and family encouraged her to take up sports. Initially, she played football as a teenager at her high school and later, in 2004, she began to take an interest in track and field. She participated in several disciplines early on, competing in the long jump, triple jump and high jump events at the Nigerian school championships and winning a medal in each. On the senior national stage, she was a triple jump bronze medalist at the 2004 Nigerian National Sports Festival. Okagbare's first international outing came at the 2006 World Junior Championships in Athletics, where she performed in the qualifying rounds of both the long and triple jump competitions.

In May 2007, at the All-Africa Games trials in Lagos, she established a Nigerian record of 14.13 meters in the triple jump. At the 2007 All-Africa Games she won the silver medal in the long jump and finished fourth in the triple jump. In the latter competition her Nigerian record was beaten by Chinonye Ohadugha, who jumped 14.21 meters.

Olympic and African medals
As a 19-year-old, she won a silver medal in the women's long jump event at the 2008 Summer Olympics in Beijing. She was selected to compete at the 2009 World Championships in Athletics but did not start either the 100 m or long jump.

Okagbare scored a 100 m/long jump double at the NCAA Women's Outdoor Track and Field Championship for University of Texas at El Paso, completing an undefeated collegiate streak for the UTEP Miners that year. She won the Nigerian 100 m title in 2010, running a time of 11.04 seconds, and stated that she was opting out of the long jump in order to save herself for the upcoming African championships.

At the African Championships in 2010, she won gold in the long jump again with a distance of 6.62 m while her compatriot Comfort Onyali took silver. Okagbare also won gold in the 100 m distance with a run of 11.03 s flat, while Gabon's Ruddy Zang Milama and compatriot Oludamola Osayomi won silver and bronze with runs of 11.15 s and 11.22 s respectively. She won her third gold at the end of the championship as part of the Nigerian 4×100 m women's relay team. The team of Okagbare, Osayomi, Lawretta Ozoh and Agnes Osazuwa set a new championship record with a run of 43.43 s, more than a full second ahead of the silver-winning Cameroonian quartet.

In 2011, Okagbare continued to build on her earlier endeavours by establishing herself as a 100 m runner. At the 2011 World Championships in Daegu, Okagbare placed fifth in the 100 m final with a run of 11.12 s. However, she did not make it to the final of the long jump as her best jump of 6.36 m was not enough to get her out of her qualifying group. She concluded her 2011 season by winning three medals at the All Africa Games in Maputo, Mozambique. She won silver in the 100 m behind compatriot Oludamola Osayomi with a run of 11.01 s and gold in the long jump with a jump of 6.50 m. She was part of the Nigerian quartet that won gold in the 4 × 100 m with a time of 43.34.

2012 was a busy year for Okagbare. She jumped 6.97 m in the long jump in Calabar during the Nigerian championship. She won new continental medals at the 2012 African Championships in Porto-Novo. In the 100 m, she was beaten to silver by Zang Milama, while in the long jump, she claimed gold with a jump of 6.96 m.

London 2012 and 2013 World Championships
At London 2012, Okagbare participated in her second Olympic Games. Going into the Olympics, she had run several fast 100 m races, and there was much anticipation and hope of a medal. However, the 2012 Olympics were not as successful for Okagbare as her 2008 outing. She established a new personal best of 10.92 s in the 100 m semi-final but placed eighth in the final with a run of 11.01 s.

2013 would prove to be a breakthrough year for Okagbare. In April 2013, in Walnut, California, Blessing Okagbare set a personal record in the 200 m with a time of 22.31 s. Then, in July, she improved her personal best in the long jump with successive jumps of 6.98 m at the Athletissima meet in Lausanne and 7.00 m during the Monaco Herculis meet. On 27 July 2013, at the London Anniversary Games, Okagbare set a new African record of 10.86 s in her 100 m race. She won the final about an hour later, setting a new African record of 10.79, in a race where she beat reigning 100 m Olympic gold medalist Shelly-Ann Fraser-Pryce. Okagbare's record eclipsed the existing record by compatriot Glory Alozie of 10.90 s, which had stood since 1998.

At the 2013 World Championships in Moscow, Okagbare won the silver medal in the long jump. Her jump of 6.99 m put her in second place behind Brittney Reese of the United States by only two centimeters. In the 100 m final, she placed sixth with a run of 11.04 s and also placed third in the 200 m race.

2014 Commonwealth Games
Okagbare participated in both the 100m and 200m races. She made it through to the finals of the 100m and won with a time of 10.85 seconds, breaking the games record of 10.91 seconds set by Debbie Ferguson-McKenzie 12 years earlier at the 2002 Commonwealth Games in Manchester. Okagbare also won the gold medal in the 200, with a time of 22.25 seconds. In doing so, she became the fourth woman to win the 100m and 200m double at the Commonwealth Games.

2015 World Relays and African Games
She ran the lead-off leg in the 4 × 200 m at the 2015 World Relays. The team consisting of Okagbare, Regina George, Dominique Duncan and Christy Udoh won the race and set an African Record in the process. She did not appear in the 200 meters at the IAAF World Championships or the All Africa Games due to a hamstring injury she sustained while finishing last in the final of the 100 meters at the World Championships.  At the end of the season, she did participate in the IAAF Diamond League meet, the Weltklasse Zürich in Zurich, finishing second in the 100 meters.  The Director General of Nigeria's National Sports Commission Al Hassan Yakmu was angered by the perceived snub:

It was initially reported that Okagbare was banned from representing Nigeria at the 2016 Olympics. The Athletics Federation of Nigeria eventually refuted the claim. Though she opted out of the individual events at the All-Africa Games, she did run in the 4 × 100 m relay and help the Nigerian team (Cecilia Francis, Okagbare, Ngozi Onwumere and Lawretta Ozoh) secure the gold medal.

2016 Rio Olympics
Blessing had a disappointing show at the 2016 Rio Olympics, as she finished without a single medal. She never made it to the final but was ranked 3rd in the 100m semifinal finishing at 11.09s, and ranked 8th with her teammates in the final of the 4 × 100 m relay.

2020 Tokyo Olympics
Okagbare won her first round heat in the 100 metres with a time of 11.05. She was subsequently suspended on 31 July 2021 after failing a drug test taken on 19 July 2021, which tested positive for human growth hormone.

2022 Athletics Integrity Unit (AIU) Ban
On 18 February 2022, the AIU announced that Okagbare had been given a 10-year ban for “multiple breaches of anti-doping rules”.

The athletics body said Okagbare was banned for five years for the use of multiple prohibited substances and another five years for not cooperating with the investigation.

On 19 February 2022, the Nigerian sprinter reacted to the sentence by the Athletics Integrity Unit (AIU) by writing a statement on her verified Instagram page that her lawyers are currently studying the allegations, and she will inform the people on how it goes.

Personal life
In September 2014, she married Nigerian footballer Igho Otegheri.

International competitions

1Disqualified in the semifinal

National titles
Nigerian Athletics Championships
100 meters: 2009, 2010, 2011, 2012, 2013, 2014, 2016
200 meters: 2013, 2014, 2016
Long jump: 2007, 2008, 2009, 2011, 2012, 2013
Triple jump: 2007, 2008
NCAA Women's Division I Outdoor Track and Field Championships
100 meters: 2010
Long jump: 2010
NCAA Women's Division I Indoor Track and Field Championships
60 meters: 2010

Circuit wins
100 m
Meeting Sport Solidarietà: 2010
London Grand Prix: 2012, 2013
Herculis: 2012
IAAF World Challenge Beijing: 2013
Jamaica International Invitational: 2014
Shanghai Golden Grand Prix: 2015
Meeting de Atletismo Madrid: 2016
Gyulai István Memorial: 2016, 2017
Marseille Meeting International: 2017
Hanžeković Memorial: 2017
Texas Relays: 2018
200 m
Mt. SAC Relays: 2013
British Grand Prix: 2013
Shanghai Golden Grand Prix: 2014
Meeting Areva: 2014
Michael Johnson Classic: 2016
Folksam Grand Prix: 2016
KBC Night of Athletics: 2016
Long jump
Gyulai István Memorial: 2011
Athletissima: 2013
Herculis: 2013
Shanghai Golden Grand Prix: 2014

Personal bests
100 meters – 10.79 seconds (2013)
200 meters – 22.04 seconds (2018) 
Long jump –  (2013)
Triple jump –  (2007)
60 meters (indoor) – 7.18 seconds (2010)

Her mark of 14.13 m in the triple jump is the African under-20 record. Her best of 10.79 in the 100 m was the African senior record from 27 July 2013 to 11 June 2016, when it was beaten by Ivorian athlete Murielle Ahouré.

Seasonal bests

See also
 2018 in 100 meters
List of Olympic medalists in athletics (women)
List of Commonwealth Games medalists in athletics (women)
List of World Championships in Athletics medalists (women)
List of African Games medalists in athletics (women)
List of champions of the African Championships in Athletics
List of 2008 Summer Olympics medal winners
List of Nigerian sportspeople
200 meters at the World Championships in Athletics
Long jump at the Olympics

References

External links

1988 births
Living people
Nigerian female sprinters
Nigerian female long jumpers
Nigerian female triple jumpers
Sportspeople from Delta State
Olympic female sprinters
Olympic female long jumpers
Olympic athletes of Nigeria
Olympic silver medalists in athletics (track and field)
Athletes (track and field) at the 2008 Summer Olympics
Athletes (track and field) at the 2012 Summer Olympics
Athletes (track and field) at the 2016 Summer Olympics
Medalists at the 2008 Summer Olympics
Commonwealth Games gold medallists for Nigeria
Commonwealth Games silver medallists for Nigeria
Commonwealth Games medallists in athletics
Athletes (track and field) at the 2014 Commonwealth Games
Athletes (track and field) at the 2018 Commonwealth Games
World Athletics Championships athletes for Nigeria
World Athletics Championships medalists
African Games gold medalists for Nigeria
African Games silver medalists for Nigeria
African Games medalists in athletics (track and field)
UTEP Miners women's track and field athletes
Athletes (track and field) at the 2007 All-Africa Games
Athletes (track and field) at the 2011 All-Africa Games
Athletes (track and field) at the 2015 African Games
Urhobo people
Athletes (track and field) at the 2019 African Games
Olympic silver medalists for Nigeria
Commonwealth Games gold medallists in athletics
Athletes (track and field) at the 2020 Summer Olympics
Doping cases in athletics
Nigerian sportspeople in doping cases
21st-century Nigerian women
Medallists at the 2014 Commonwealth Games
Medallists at the 2018 Commonwealth Games